The Commission for Investigation of Abuse of Authority (CIAA) is an apex constitutional body for corruption control for the Government of Nepal. The Constitution of Nepal has empowered CIAA to investigate and probe cases against the persons holding any public office and their associates who are indulged in the abuse of authority by way of corruption. As a constitutional body, the authority vested on CIAA are as per the Article 238 and 239 of the Constitution of Nepal. Prem Kumar Rai is the Chief Commissioner of the Commission for Investigation of Abuse of Authority. Commissioners are Kishor Kumar Silwal, Jaya Bahadur Chand, Dr. Hari Poudel, Dr. Sumitra Shrestha Amatya.

The Fundamental function of the Commission for Investigation of Abuse of Authority (CIAA) is to prevent corruption. The Commission is the only body to investigate, prosecute and bring actions against officials accused of corruption or maladministration.CIAA Nepal

The CIAA will initiate investigations against all public officials if the complaint is made in writing or in the media or through any source related to allegations of abuse of power.

History
Commissioner Raj Narayan Pathak resigned on February 15, 2019 after news reports of corruption surfaced about a Medical College License. The commission has sue a case against Pathak for the case.  He is said to have taken 8.7 million rupees as bribe to settle corruption claim in Nepal Engineering College.

References

External links
 Commissioners of Nepal

Politics of Nepal
Anti-corruption agencies
Corruption in Nepal